Zezinando Odelfrides Gomes Correia (born 1 January 1987), known simply as Zezinando, is a Portuguese footballer who plays for Thai club Trat F.C. as a defensive midfielder.

Club career
Born in Bissau, Zezinando moved with his parents to Portugal still an infant, and, at the age of 12, he joined Sporting Clube de Portugal's famed youth academy. In the following three years, he would only collect some appearances for the Lions during preseason, being successively loaned to clubs in the Lisbon area, appearing in the 2006–07 season in the second division with G.D. Estoril Praia and playing in the third level in the following years.

On 26 June 2009, Zezinando underwent a trial at Heart of Midlothian of Scotland alongside compatriot João Moreira. An eventual deal fell through, and both signed with C.F. Estrela da Amadora in the third tier of Portuguese football.

In late October 2011, after more than one year without a club, Zezinando joined Samut Songkhram F.C. in the Thai Premier League.

International career
Zezinando chose to represent Portugal internationally. He appeared with the under-20s at the 2007 FIFA World Cup in Canada, playing all four matches in an eventual round-of-16 exit.

Honours
Air Force Central
Thai Division 1 League: 2013

References

External links

1987 births
Living people
Bissau-Guinean emigrants to Portugal
Bissau-Guinean footballers
Portuguese footballers
Association football midfielders
Liga Portugal 2 players
Segunda Divisão players
Sporting CP footballers
G.D. Estoril Praia players
Atlético Clube de Portugal players
Real S.C. players
C.F. Estrela da Amadora players
Thai League 1 players
Thai League 2 players
Samut Songkhram F.C. players
Air Force United F.C. players
Portugal youth international footballers
Bissau-Guinean expatriate footballers
Portuguese expatriate footballers
Expatriate footballers in Thailand
Portuguese expatriate sportspeople in Thailand